David Estrada (born February 4, 1988) is a Mexican-American former soccer player who previously played for New Mexico United in the USL Championship. He played as either a forward, or more often for New Mexico United, as a right winger.

Early life and amateur
Estrada was born in Morelia, Michoacán, Mexico and moved to California with his family at four months old. He was raised in Salinas, California and attended Alisal High School. A successful player at the high school level, Estrada led the nation his senior season with 66 goals, including 11 in one game—the second-most single-game goals in state history.

He played four years of college soccer at UCLA. As a walk-on his freshman year, he was the team's top scorer, was named Soccer America's National Freshman of the Year, was a second-team All-Pac-10 selection and was voted UCLA's Offensive MVP. After missing the first seven matches of his sophomore year because of a fractured foot, he was again named to the All-Pac-10 second-team in 2007. He received All-Pac-10 honors for the third time in his career, being named to the honorable mention team in 2008, and earned third-team NSCAA All-Far West honors and first-team All-Pac-10 acclaim in his senior year. In his senior season, Estrada recorded three goals and seven assists playing a wide right midfield position.

During his college years Estrada also played four seasons with Salinas Valley Samba in the National Premier Soccer League.

Career

Professional
Estrada was drafted in the first round (11th overall) of the 2010 MLS SuperDraft by Seattle Sounders FC. He made his professional debut on April 3, 2010, coming on as a substitute in a game against the New York Red Bulls.

On March 17, 2012, Estrada started in the Sounders first match of the season, and recorded his first three professional goals, scoring a hat trick.

Estrada was traded to D.C. United on August 7, 2014, in exchange for a third-round pick in the 2017 MLS SuperDraft.

Estrada was cut by D.C. United in February 2015, going on trial with Tippeligaen side Stabæk.

On March 20, 2015, Estrada signed for the Sacramento Republic. On August 10, Estrada was released by Sacramento.

After a spell with Orange County Blues FC, Estrada moved to USL side Charlotte Independence on February 3, 2016.

On March 14, 2018, Estrada signed with Seattle Sounders FC 2 as a player and as an assistant coach with the Sounders FC Academy.

On December 18, 2018, Estrada signed with New Mexico United. Estrada won Humanitarian of the Year with New Mexico United in November 2019.

International
Estrada was called up for a U.S. Under-18 national team camp in January 2007, but has not yet played internationally for any country.

Career statistics

Honours

Seattle Sounders FC
Lamar Hunt U.S. Open Cup (2): 2010, 2011

References

External links
 

1988 births
Living people
Sportspeople from Morelia
Footballers from Michoacán
Sportspeople from Salinas, California
American sportspeople of Mexican descent
Mexican emigrants to the United States
Association football forwards
Mexican footballers
American soccer players
Seattle Sounders FC players
Atlanta Silverbacks players
Charlotte Eagles players
D.C. United players
Sacramento Republic FC players
Orange County SC players
Charlotte Independence players
UCLA Bruins men's soccer players
University of California, Los Angeles alumni
Seattle Sounders FC draft picks
Major League Soccer players
North American Soccer League players
Tacoma Defiance players
USL Championship players
New Mexico United players
Soccer players from California